Ramjas School Anand Parbat is a school in Anand Parbat, New Delhi, India. It was founded in 1971 by Ramjas Foundation. The school is housed in two wings - Junior Wing and Senior Wing. It is a Senior Secondary School affiliated with Central Board of Secondary Education.

Academics

Infrastructure
The school is divided into three wings: pre-primary, primary, senior, and senior secondary. These buildings contain large classrooms, well-equipped laboratories, computer rooms, audio visual rooms, libraries, and rooms for creative activities such as art, painting, music, and dance. All three complexes have open areas for gatherings and sports activities, among other things.

Controversy

In May 2017, parents protested against Principal Sandhya Bindal against corporal punishment on students, discrimination and heavy handedness. The principal harassed students and plotted schemes to get them suspended. A girl was also physically harassed and threatened outside a toilet.

In a leaked call recording, it was revealed the principal had devised to frame a student by putting Diwali Crackers in his school bag.

In 2018, the school was alleged to have forced students who got admission under Right To Education Act in EWS category to buy books and uniforms on inflated prices.

In 2019, the Ramjas Foundation replaced Devesh Gupta as chairman of the school. Gupta filed a petition in Delhi High Court against the order and was restored as chairman.

References

Schools in Delhi